Thomas Bek, Beck, or Becke (died 12 May 1293) was a Bishop of St David's in Wales.

Bek was the second son of Walter Bek of Ereseby, Lincolnshire, England and the elder brother of Antony Bek, the Bishop of Durham.

Bek was educated at Oxford University. Between 1269 and 1273, he was chancellor of the university.

Thomas Bek entered the Royal Household as keeper of the wardrobe in October 1274 and was temporarily custodian of the Great Seal in 1279. He was a trusted servant of King Edward I and obtained many important and wealthy ecclesiastical positions. He was an Archdeacon of Dorset and became Bishop of St David's in 1280 until his death in 1293, founding two collegiate churches and two hospitals in the bishopric.

References

13th-century births
Year of birth unknown
1293 deaths
Alumni of the University of Oxford
13th-century English Roman Catholic bishops
Archdeacons of Dorset
Bishops of St Davids
Chancellors of the University of Oxford